Speakeasy was a daytime show, that broadcast on TV Three in Ireland from 1998 till 1999.

The show was replaced by Ireland AM in 1999.

References

Irish television shows
Virgin Media Television (Ireland) original programming